Martin Guzik (born 7 April 1974) is a Czech former professional footballer who played as a midfielder. He played in the Gambrinus liga for SK České Budějovice and SK Sigma Olomouc. He also played in the 2. Bundesliga in Germany for a season.

Guzik played international football at under-21 level for Czech Republic U21. He played in the 1993 Toulon Tournament.

References

External links
 
 
 Profile at Alemannia Aachen 
 Profile at FC Zürich 

1974 births
Living people
Czech footballers
Association football midfielders
Czech Republic under-21 international footballers
Czech First League players
Swiss Super League players
2. Bundesliga players
SK Dynamo České Budějovice players
SK Sigma Olomouc players
1. FC Bocholt players
FC Zürich players
FC Baden players
FC Schaffhausen players
KFC Uerdingen 05 players
FC Chiasso players
Alemannia Aachen players
VfB Oldenburg players
Czech expatriate footballers
Czech expatriate sportspeople in Switzerland
Expatriate footballers in Switzerland
Czech expatriate sportspeople in Germany
Expatriate footballers in Germany
SK Hanácká Slavia Kroměříž players